Kerry Marbury (March 21, 1952 – June 23, 2019) was a Canadian football running back in the Canadian Football League (CFL) who played for the Toronto Argonauts and Ottawa Rough Riders. He played college football for the West Virginia Mountaineers.

He was a high school football teammate and lifelong friend of Alabama head coach Nick Saban. After his playing days were over, he served as a professor of Humanities, Race, Class and Gender at Fairmont State University.

References

1952 births
2019 deaths
American football running backs
Canadian football running backs
Ottawa Rough Riders players
Toronto Argonauts players
West Virginia Mountaineers football players